Michael R. Fitzpatrick is a judge of the Wisconsin Court of Appeals, serving in the court's Madison-based District IV since 2017.  Previously, he served nine years as a Wisconsin circuit court judge in Rock County.

Life and career 
Fitzpatrick received his Juris Doctor degree from Drake University Law School and then practiced law in Janesville, Wisconsin. In 2008, Fitzpatrick was appointed to the Rock County Circuit Court by Governor Jim Doyle, a Democrat. He was subsequently elected to two six-years terms on the court, in 2009 and 2015.  In April 2017, Fitzpatrick was elected without opposition to the Wisconsin Court of Appeals in District IV, to replace retiring Judge Paul Higginbotham.

Fitzpatrick has announced he will not seek re-election to another term on the court in 2023.

Electoral history

Wisconsin Circuit Court (2009, 2015)

| colspan="6" style="text-align:center;background-color: #e9e9e9;"| General Election, April 7, 2009

| colspan="6" style="text-align:center;background-color: #e9e9e9;"| General Election, April 7, 2015

Wisconsin Court of Appeals (2017)

| colspan="6" style="text-align:center;background-color: #e9e9e9;"| General Election, April 4, 2017

References

External links
Wisconsin Court of Appeals-Michael R. Fitzpatrick

Year of birth missing (living people)
Living people
People from Janesville, Wisconsin
Wisconsin state court judges
Wisconsin Court of Appeals judges
Wisconsin lawyers
21st-century American judges
Drake University Law School alumni